David Michael Rhys Davies (born 3 March 1985) is a Welsh former competitive swimmer who has represented Wales at the Commonwealth Games, and swam for Great Britain at Summer Olympics, world championships and European championships, winning medals in each of those major international championships.  Davies specialised in long-distance freestyle and open water events.  Born in Barry, Vale of Glamorgan, Davies swam for Wales at the 2002 and 2006 Commonwealth Games and represented Great Britain at the 2004, 2008 Olympics and 2012 Olympics.  As of the end of 2010, he held the British Records in the 400-, 800- and 1500-metre freestyle events.

Swimming career
At the 2003 European Junior Championships he won a gold medal. At the 2004 Olympics, he won the bronze medal in the men's 1,500m freestyle, in a time of 14:45.95 (a British and European record). He also swam at the 2004 European Championships and the 2005 World Championships.

At the 2006 Commonwealth Games, Davies won the 1,500 freestyle and was third in the 400 freestyle. In 2008, he finished second in the 1500 free at the 2008 Short Course Worlds.

Davies represented Great Britain at the 2008 Olympics, swimming in both the pool competition and open water race. In the men's 1500m freestyle race, he finished 6th. In the open-water 10K race in Beijing, Davies finished second in the new Olympic event. Shortly after finishing the event, there was concern for Davies' state of health as First Aid staff rushed to stretcher him off for medical attention. Davies told the BBC shortly afterward: "For the last part of it I was delirious, I wanted it so bad. I've given it everything – the stretcher at the end was a bit mad but I've got something to show for it. I felt a bit violated to be honest, people swimming all over me, and the last lap was a real struggle.".

Davies qualified for the Olympics 10K at the 2008 Open Water World Championships in Seville, Spain where he finished just 0.03 behind the winner.

Personal bests and records held
Long course (50 m)

Short course (25 m)

See also
 List of Commonwealth Games medallists in swimming (men)
 List of Olympic medalists in swimming (men)

References

External links
British Swimming athlete profile
British Olympic Association athlete profile 

1985 births
Living people
Welsh male swimmers
Welsh male freestyle swimmers
Male long-distance swimmers
Swimmers at the 2004 Summer Olympics
Swimmers at the 2006 Commonwealth Games
Swimmers at the 2008 Summer Olympics
Swimmers at the 2012 Summer Olympics
Olympic swimmers of Great Britain
Olympic silver medallists for Great Britain
Olympic bronze medallists for Great Britain
Commonwealth Games gold medallists for Wales
Commonwealth Games bronze medallists for Wales
Sportspeople from Barry, Vale of Glamorgan
Welsh Olympic medallists
Olympic bronze medalists in swimming
People educated at St Cyres Comprehensive School
World Aquatics Championships medalists in swimming
Medalists at the FINA World Swimming Championships (25 m)
European Aquatics Championships medalists in swimming
Medalists at the 2008 Summer Olympics
Medalists at the 2004 Summer Olympics
Olympic silver medalists in swimming
Commonwealth Games medallists in swimming
Medallists at the 2006 Commonwealth Games